Yazini Tetyana is a South African politician who has served as a member of the National Assembly of South Africa since March 2023. He served in the Eastern Cape Provincial Legislature from 2019 until 2023. Tetyana was the provincial chairperson of the EFF from 2018 until 2022.

Background
Tetyana was born in the Candu location outside Idutywa. He matriculated from Dalindyebo High School and studied for a degree in political science at the University of KwaZulu-Natal.

Political career
In October 2018, Tetyana was elected chairperson of the EFF in the Eastern Cape. He had previously been the convenor of the provincial structure after its disbanding. In the 2019 election, Tetyana was elected to represent the EFF in the Eastern Cape Provincial Legislature.

At the EFF's provincial conference in November 2022, Tetyana was defeated by former Nelson Mandela Bay councillor Zilindile Vena in the election for provincial chairperson of the EFF.

Tetyana resigned from the provincial legislature on 18 January 2023. He said that his resignation was not related to his unsuccessful bid for re-election at the party's provincial conference in November 2022. Tetyana added that he would remain a member of the EFF.

Parliamentary career
On 15 March 2023, Tetyana was sworn in as a Member of the National Assembly of South Africa.

References

Living people
Year of birth missing (living people)
Xhosa people
Economic Freedom Fighters politicians
Members of the Eastern Cape Provincial Legislature
Members of the National Assembly of South Africa
21st-century South African politicians
University of KwaZulu-Natal alumni